Mordellistena pseudotarsata is a species of beetle in the genus Mordellistena of the family Mordellidae. It was described by Ermisch in 1964.

References

Beetles described in 1964
pseudotarsata